Šener Bajramović (born 12 September 1950) is a retired Bosnian football player and manager.

References

1950 births
Living people
Footballers from Sarajevo
Association football midfielders
Yugoslav footballers
FK Željezničar Sarajevo players
Yugoslav First League players
Bosnia and Herzegovina football managers
GFK Tikvesh managers
Bosnia and Herzegovina national under-21 football team managers
FK Sloga Jugomagnat managers
FK Sarajevo managers
HNK Orašje managers
NK Jedinstvo Bihać managers
NK Iskra Bugojno managers
FK Goražde managers
Bosnia and Herzegovina expatriate football managers
Expatriate football managers in North Macedonia
Bosnia and Herzegovina expatriate sportspeople in North Macedonia